The Kent St Leger is a greyhound racing competition held annually at Crayford Stadium. 

It was held at Ramsgate Stadium until the track closed, then it switched to Crayford in 1996.

Past winners

Venues & Distances 
1989–1995 (Ramsgate 640m)
1996–present (Crayford 714m)

Sponsors
1989–1995 (Max Thomas Bookmakers)
1998–1998 (John Humphreys & Tony Morris Bookmakers)
2001–2002 (Courage Brewery)
2003–2003 (Consumer Advisory)
2004–2004 (Courage Brewery)
2005–2013 (John Smith's Brewery)
2014–2016 (Carlsberg)
2017–2020 (Jay & Kay Coach Tours)
2021–2021 (Ladbrokes)
2022–present (Jay & Kay Coach Tours)

References

Greyhound racing competitions in the United Kingdom
Sport in the London Borough of Bexley
Sport in Kent
Recurring sporting events established in 1989